The domine (Epinnula magistralis) is a tropical species of snake mackerel found in all oceans at depths of from . This species can reach a length of  SL though most do not exceed  SL. While not specifically targeted, this fish is edible and is eaten when caught.

References 

Gempylidae
Fish described in 1854
Taxa named by Felipe Poey